The imposter hutia (Hexolobodon phenax) is an extinct species of rodent in the hutia subfamily (Capromyinae). It is the only species in the genus Hexolobodon and tribe Hexolobodontini. It was found only on the Caribbean island of Hispaniola (Haiti and the Dominican Republic), and went extinct sometime after European colonization in the 1500s.

History
The remains were found in association with those from rats of the genus Rattus, which suggests that the imposter hutia survived until the time of European colonization of the island, and may have gone extinct due to predation from introduced rodents.

References

Hutias
Rodent extinctions since 1500
Mammals described in 1929
Extinct rodents
Mammals of Hispaniola
Mammals of the Dominican Republic
Mammals of Haiti
Mammals of the Caribbean
Extinct animals of Haiti
Extinct animals of the Dominican Republic
Taxonomy articles created by Polbot